Echinobase is a Model Organism Database (MOD). It supports the international research community by providing a centralized, integrated web based resource to access the diverse and rich, functional genomics data of echinoderm evolution, development and gene regulatory networks.  

Genomic research data and tools are available for searching, browsing and bioinformatic analysis of genomes, genes, and transcripts. 

Echinobase provides a critical data sharing infrastructure for other NIH-funded projects and enhances the availability and visibility of echinoderm data to the broader biomedical research community.

Supported Species 
Echinobase offers two levels of integration for supported echinoderm species. Level one includes full genome integration in the database, including gene pages, as well as availability of the genomes to BLAST, browsing via JBrowse, and download via FTP. Level two support provides BLAST, JBrowse, and download options, but no gene page integration.

Current level one supported species (at various stages of integration) are:
 Purple sea urchin, Strongylocentrotus purpuratus
 Bat star, Patiria miniata
 Green variegated sea urchin, Lytechinus variegatus
 Crown-of-thorns starfish, Acanthaster planci

Current level two supported species (at various stages of integration) are:
 Feather star, Anneissia japonica (a crinoid)
 Sugar star, Asterias rubens

Software, Hardware and Platform 
Echinobase runs in a cloud environment. Its virtual machines are running in a VMware vSphere environment on two servers, with automatic load balancing and fault tolerance. Its software uses Java, JSP, JavaScript, AJAX, XML, and CSS. It also uses IBM's WebSphere Application Server and the IBM Db2 database. Echinobase is developed in tandem with Xenbase.

Functional Genomics 
Echinobase is a resource for genomics research that is organized by gene models and represented using gene pages. Each gene page has a tremendous amount of gene specific information. 

Genomics - Search and BLAST tools are available directly or through the gene pages that display gene model HGNC compliant names, orthology, GO terms and link to BLAST, the JBrowse genome browser, and a gene expression plotting tool.

Tabs beyond the summary provide gene specific literature, transcripts, expression data, protein sequences and interactants.

Genomic research tools are implemented to assist browsing, search and analysis and visualization of genomic sequence assemblies, annotations and features.  Additionally, gene expression data collection, search and visualization is provided.
Gene search  - Search genes by name, symbol or synonym directly from the landing page
Gene nomenclature guidelines  - Echinobase is the official body responsible for echinoderm gene naming
Genome browser with tracks for RNA-seq and ATAC-seq data - Echinobase uses JBrowse
BLAST - Users can BLAST against supported genomes, RNA, and protein sequences
RNA-seq data visualization - Plots of temporal expression profiles and spatial (anatomy) expression heatmaps for S. purpuratus
Diseases - Users can search for both Disease Ontology and OMIM diseases to find relevant genes and publications

The Echinoderm Anatomical Ontology (ECAO) uses standardized terms to refer to anatomical cell types and structures and relates these to developmental stages. Numerous echinoderm species are included in the ontology so that some terms are present in all echinoderms while others are species specific. The ECAO contains thousands of anatomical terms for cell types, structures and tissues and anatomical systems such as the nervous system or skeletal system. Relationships between entities are defined using "develops_from" or "develops_into" and "is_a" or "part_of". 
Echinoderm Anatomical Ontology - Standardized anatomy terms are used to describe developmental stages

Literature, Resources and Community 
Literature on Echinobase is collected by automatically searching published papers using echinoderm query terms and retrieved articles are then manually curated.
Literature Search - Users can search for papers based on title, author, journal, etc.
The FTP download site makes GFF genome files available and Gene Page Reports provide files for bioinformatic analyses.
EchinoWiki and FTP -The Echinobase Resources serve to support the community by collecting data, protocols, reagents and other resources that are then shared using the EchinoWiki.
Reagents - Echinobase has reagent search tools for antibodies (Ab), morpholinos (MO), and guide RNAs (gRNA) used in published studies.

In order to support the Community and to enable interdisciplinary and collaborative studies, research, descriptions and contact information of community members, labs and organizations are available and searchable. New Job Openings are also posted on Echinobase.
Community Link - People, jobs, labs which study echinoderms

Other Model Organism Databases (MODs) 
 Xenbase
 Flybase
 Wormbase
 Mouse Genome Informatics
 ZFIN
 DictyBase

References

External links 
 Baylor Sea Urchin Genome Project
 Sea Urchin Genome at NCBI
 Sea Urchin Gene Catalog at MPIMG
 S. purpuratus Gene  Expression - NIDCR
 Endomesoderm Gene Regulatory Network
 Virtual Urchin
 Patent: Gene regulatory networks and methods of interdiction for controlling the differentiation state of a cell

:Gene regulatory networks

Biorepositories
Cell biology
Model organism databases
Biological databases
Bioinformatics
Scientific databases